Lahcen Babaci (born 4 May 1957) is an Algerian middle-distance runner. He competed in the men's 3000 metres steeplechase at the 1980 Summer Olympics.

References

External links
 

1957 births
Living people
Athletes (track and field) at the 1980 Summer Olympics
Algerian male middle-distance runners
Algerian male steeplechase runners
Olympic athletes of Algeria
Place of birth missing (living people)
21st-century Algerian people
20th-century Algerian people